Hillhead High School is a day school in Glasgow, Scotland, on Oakfield Avenue, neighbouring the University of Glasgow.

Admissions
It is one of the largest schools in Glasgow.

History

Grammar school
Until 1972 it was a co-educational selective school. It then became a comprehensive school.

Comprehensive
In 1972 the local authority in Glasgow abolished the selectivity process and the school gradually became a comprehensive school serving its geographical catchment area of Glasgow's West End, and serving many pupils from wider afield who had attended the primary school.

Former teachers
 Colin Campbell, SNP MSP from 1999 to 2003 for West of Scotland (taught from 1961 to 1963)

School facilities
The school has two buildings, the Main Building and the Terrace Building.  It also uses the nearby Wellington Church for mass assemblies at October, Christmas, Easter and Summer.

The X-shaped listed Main Building, acquired in the 1930s, is the larger of the two buildings, and is where most pupils begin their studies. Most of the school's classrooms and offices are situated on its four floors. Also in the Main Building is the library, where a career and exam advisor makes biweekly appearances. The main building was designed by E G Wylie in 1921, and construction finished in 1929. It is now protected as a category B listed building.

Originally owned by the University of Glasgow, the Terrace Building was acquired by Hillhead in c.2001. This building is used primarily for applied studies.

Notable former pupils

 Don Arrol, Glaswegian comedian and presenter of Sunday Night at the London Palladium in the early sixties
 Stanley Baxter, Glaswegian actor
 Menzies Campbell, former leader of the Liberal Democrats
 Kari Corbett, actress
 Prof Gordon Younger Craig, FRSE, geologist, James Hutton Professor of Geology 1967–84 University of Edinburgh, founder trustee of Our Dynamic Earth
 Prof Jack D. Dunitz, Professor of Chemical Crystallography from 1957 to 1990 at ETH Zurich, and known for the Bürgi–Dunitz angle
 Ian Dunn (d. 1998), gay and paedophile rights activist, founder of the Scottish Minorities Group
 Sir Alastair Dunnett, journalist and newspaper editor, Editor from 1956 to 1972 of The Scotsman, and from 1946 to 1955 of the Daily Record
 Islam Feruz, first footballer to play for Scotland under the school qualification rule
 Alexander Fleck, 1st Baron Fleck, chairman from 1953 to 1960 of ICI
 Laura Fraser, actress
 Janice Hally, playwright and scriptwriter
 Gilbert Highet, Anthon Professor of the Latin Language and Literature from 1950 to 1972 at Columbia University, New York
 Prof E. A. J. Honigmann, Joseph Cowen Professor of English Literature from 1970 to 1989 at Newcastle University
 Gordon Jackson OBE, actor, noted for The Great Escape and The Professionals
 Prof Janusz Jankowski, doctor and academic
 Vera Kenmure, (1904-1973) Scottish minister
 George Leslie, politician
 Ian MacGregor, metallurgist and industrialist, antagonist in the UK miners' strike (1984-1985), chairman from 1983 to 1986 of the National Coal Board, and Chief Executive from 1980 to 1983 of the British Steel Corporation
 Harry McGowan, 1st Baron McGowan, chairman from 1930 to 1950 of ICI
 Alexander Mackendrick, film director
 Alistair MacLean, author
 Saul Metzstein, film director
 Edward Rosslyn Mitchell, Labour MP from 1924 to 1929 for Paisley 
 Shuna Scott Sendall, opera singer
 Walter Owen, translator of S.American poetry (Argentine gaucho epic Martin Fierro, etc.)
 Sir Horace Phillips CMG, Ambassador to Turkey from 1973 to 1977, High Commissioner to Tanzania from 1968 to 1972, and Ambassador to Indonesia from 1966 to 1968
 Sir John Rennie CMG OBE, Governor of Mauritius (the last before its independence) from 1962 to 1968
Anne Strachan Robertson, archaeologist and numismatist
 Ian Rodger, co-founder of Scottish Opera 
 Prof Archie Roy, 
 Robert Service, poet
 May Miles Thomas, film director
 Alexander Trocchi, novelist who wrote Young Adam
 Jean Turner, former Independent MSP from 2003 to 2007 for Strathkelvin and Bearsden
 Jonathan Watson, comedian. (Only an Excuse?)
 James Alfred Wight OBE, writer and veterinary surgeon from 1939 to 1990 (pen name: James Herriot)
 Sir Charles Wilson, first Vice-Chancellor from 1957 to 1961 of the University of Leicester, then Principal of the University of Glasgow from 1961 to 1976
 John Young, Conservative MSP from 1999 to 2003 for West of Scotland.

References

External links
   Hillhead High's official website
Hillhead High School's page on Parentzone
 League tables for the school — Taken from BBC Education

1885 establishments in Scotland
Category B listed buildings in Glasgow
Educational institutions established in 1885
Listed schools in Scotland
Secondary schools in Glasgow
Hillhead